Benjamin Ngoubou (23 July 1925 – 15 March 2008) was the foreign minister of Gabon from 1967 to 1968.

References

1924 births
2008 deaths
Foreign ministers of Gabon
21st-century Gabonese people